Human magnetism is a popular name for an alleged ability of some people to attract objects to their skin. People alleged to have such an ability are often called human magnets. Although metal objects are the most popular, some are also alleged to be able to stick other types of materials, such as glass, porcelain, wood or plastic as well as metals with no ferromagnetic properties such as brass and aluminium. However, none of the recorded claims of human magnetism corresponds with the physics of magnetism.

Selected claimed human magnets 
 Aurel Răileanu from Romania, also known as "Mr. Magnet"; is said to be the strongest human magnet
 Etibar Elchyev from Georgia, Guinness World Record holder for most spoons on a human body
 Ivan Stoiljkovic, a boy from Croatia
 Liew Thow Lin, known as Mr. Magnetic Man
Dalibor Jablanović from Serbia, Guinness World Record holder for most spoons on a human face
Arun Raikar from India, who could lift  of metal upon his body
 Agnė Kulitaitė from Lithuania is known to hold metal objects on her forehead or even cheeks.

Explanations 
Many of the people who can adhere objects to their body can do so not only with metal but also other materials. That would suggest that the phenomenon cannot be explained by magnetism and uses a different kind of physical effect. Skeptic Benjamin Radford has used a compass to check the magnetic field of a person that claimed to be a human magnet. He concluded that person did not produce magnetic fields. He also noted that those people usually have smooth and hairless skin and lean back slightly while sticking objects, which would not be necessary if they possessed magnetic powers. Many scientists and proponents of science, including James Randi, have explained this ability by friction and sticky skin; to prove that, Randi has demonstrated that human magnets lose their powers when they are covered in talc.

See also 
 Animal magnetism
 Biomagnetism
 Magnetoception
 Sherri Tenpenny, who claimed the COVID-19 vaccine turns people into human magnets

References 

Magnetism
Paranormal hoaxes
Parapsychology